Shadow Force is a 1992 American film. It was filmed in the San Antonio area of Texas and was released straight to video.

Plot
In the fictional town of Norman, close to San Antonio, the local police is composed of professional assassins. With one exception, the police chief down to the dispatcher are all on the payroll of a local racketeer who makes use of these paid killers to dispose of zealous law enforcement officials opposed to his operations. When the last remaining honorable member of the force (Glenn Corbett) is killed, his brother-in-law (Dirk Benedict), a homicide detective from an unidentified city in Kansas begins an investigation of his own.

Cast
 Dirk Benedict as Detective Rick Kelly
 Lise Cutter as Mary Denton
 Lance LeGault as Norman Police Chief Thorpe
 Dixie K. Wade as Maggie
 Steve Carlson as Mike Gorman
 Julius Tennon as Ron Fuller
 Bob Hastings as Norman Mayor Talbert
 Danny Spear as Sam Johnson
 Rey David Pena as Emilio Vela
 Glenn Corbett as Al Finch Sr.

External links
 Shadow Force IMDB

1992 direct-to-video films
1992 films
Films set in Texas
Films shot in San Antonio
1992 action films
American action films
1990s English-language films
1990s American films